Brian Erichsen (born 18 August 1977 in Winnipeg, Manitoba, Canada) is a Canadian rugby union coach and former player. He played for the Canada national side and was part of the Canada squad at the 2011 Rugby World Cup. He played as a lock and made his Canada debut in 2009 against Russia and now has 5 caps in total.
 He is head coach of the Denver Barbarians RFC XV's sides.

Brian also played for the Manitoba Major Junior Hockey League (MMJHL) in Winnipeg for a few years (1997, 1998). He played defence for the Charleswood Hawks as number 4.

References

External links
ESPN Profile
Team Canada Profile

1977 births
Canadian rugby union players
Living people
Canada international rugby union players
Sportspeople from Winnipeg
Rugby union locks